WPTL (920 AM) is a radio station broadcasting the Real Country music format from Westwood One Networks. WPTL is licensed to Canton, North Carolina, United States.  The station is currently owned by Skycountry Broadcasting. WPTL went on the air in 1963. Bill Reck  owned the station since 1978 and retired in November 12, 2020. Bill's daughter - Terryll Evans is the new owner and is following in her fathers foot steps.

WPTL has aired the football games of Pisgah High School since 1992, when WWIT dropped them. The station also airs Pisgah basketball, softball and baseball.

John Anderson is the weekday morning host. The former host was Frank Byrd.
 
On February 7, 2018, WPTL added an FM signal at 101.7, broadcasting from Chambers Mountain, giving the station better coverage of all of Haywood County, especially at night.

References

External links

PTL
Country radio stations in the United States